L'école de la jeunesse ou Le Barnevelt françois (The School of Youth or The French Barnwell) is an opéra comique (specifically a comédie mêlée d'ariettes) in three acts by the composer Egidio Duni. The libretto, by Louis Anseaume, is based on George Lillo's play The London Merchant or The History of George Barnwell (1731). The opera was first performed at the Opéra-Comique in Paris on 24 January 1765.

Main roles

References
Notes

Sources
Original libretto: L'École de la jeunesse, ou Le Barnevelt français, Comédie. En trois Actes et en vers, mêlée d'ariettes, Paris. Duchesne, 1775
Original score: L'École de la jeunesse, ou Le Barnevelt françois, Comédie. En trois Actes et en vers, Paris, Chez l'Auteur & Lyon, Chez Castaud, s.d. via Gallica

Cook, Elisabeth (1992), "Ecole de la jeunesse, L'" in The New Grove Dictionary of Opera, ed. Stanley Sadie (London) 

Operas by Egidio Duni
Comédies mêlées d'ariettes
Opéras comiques
French-language operas
Operas
1765 operas
Opera world premieres at the Opéra-Comique
Operas based on plays